A Warm Shade of Ivory is a 1969 album by American composer and arranger Henry Mancini issued by RCA Records.
The album peaked at No. 5 on the Billboard Album Chart on 2 August 1969.
Mancini's arrangement of Nino Rota’s Love Theme from Romeo and Juliet topped the Billboard Hot 100 singles chart on June 28, 1969, and remained there for two weeks.

Reception

Greg Adams reviewed the album for Allmusic and wrote that it "focuses on his skill as a piano soloist". Adams noted that Mancini's "lush orchestrations are reminiscent of Mantovani, as piano notes sparkle on the surface of immense waves of strings...the music is not fundamentally different from his typical fare, and encompasses his usual assortment of traditional and adult pop melodies and film themes". Adams concluded that the album was "a lovely, contemplative collection that combines Mancini's skills in new and unequivocally successful ways".

High Fidelity magazine reviewed the album in July 1969 and wrote that "Underneath the piano lies a rich tapestry of orchestration that denotes Mancini's true artistry".

Track listing
"In the Wee Small Hours of the Morning" (David Mann, Bob Hilliard) – 2:48
"Cycles" (Gayle Caldwell) – 3:05
"Moment to Moment" (Henry Mancini, Johnny Mercer) – 2:54
"A Day in the Life of a Fool" (Luiz Bonfá, Carl Sigman) – 3:30
"Watch What Happens" (Norman Gimbel, Michel Legrand, Jacques Demy) – 3:20
"By the Time I Get to Phoenix" (Jimmy Webb) – 3:16
"Love Theme from Romeo and Juliet" (Nino Rota) – 2:33
"The Windmills of Your Mind" (Michel Legrand, Alan and Marilyn Bergman) – 3:00
"When I Look in Your Eyes" (Leslie Bricusse) – 2:38
"Meditation (Meditação)" (Antônio Carlos Jobim, Norman Gimbel, Newton Mendonça) – 3:09
"Dream a Little Dream of Me" (Fabian Andre, Wilbur Schwandt, Gus Kahn) – 3:15

Personnel
Henry Mancini – arranger, conductor, piano
Vincent DeRosa – French horn
Erno Neufeld – violin
Production
Mickey Crofford – engineer
Joe Reisman – producer

Certifications

References

External links
 

1969 albums
Albums arranged by Henry Mancini
RCA Records albums
Instrumental albums
Henry Mancini albums